The  (Polish: , "little tail", diminutive of ) is a diacritic hook placed under the lower right corner of a vowel in the Latin alphabet used in several European languages, and directly under a vowel in several Native American languages. It is also placed on the lower right corner of consonants in some Latin transcriptions of various indigenous languages of the Caucasus mountains.

An ogonek can also be attached to the bottom of a vowel in Old Norse–Icelandic to show length or vowel affection. For example, in Old Norse, ǫ represents the Old Norwegian vowel , which in Old Icelandic merges with ø ‹ö› and in modern Scandinavian languages is represented by the letter å.

Use
 Abaza (s̨, z̨, c̨, c̨''', j̨)
 Abkhaz (s̨, s̨u, z̨, z̨u, c̨, c̨u, c̨, c̨'u, j̨, j̨u)
 Adyghe (s̨, z̨)
 Archi (ł̨, ɫ̨)
 Numerous Athabaskan languages, including Navajo and Dogrib (ą, ą́, ę, ę́, į, į́, ǫ, ǫ́, ų, ų́, ɛ̨)
 Cayuga (letters ę, ǫ)
 Chickasaw (letters ą, į, ǫ)
 Dadibi (ą, ę, į, ǫ)
 Elfdalian (ą, ę, į, ų, y̨ and ą̊)
 some romanizations of Ancient Greek (ą, ę, ǫ)
 Ho-Chunk (ą, ąą, į, įį, ų, ųų)
 Kabardian (s̨, s̨''', z̨)
 Kashubian (ą)
 scholarly transcriptions of Vulgar Latin and Proto-Romance (ę, ǫ)
 Lithuanian (ą, ę, į, ų)
 Ojibwe in older Romanization standards, representing either nasalization or vowel backing  (ą, ąą, ą́, ę, įį, ǫǫ)
 scholarly transcriptions of Old Church Slavonic and Proto-Slavic (ę, ǫ)
 Old Norse (ǫ , ǫ́ , o᷎, ǫ᷎), (ę , æ ), (Alternatively, ą, etc. instead represent any nasalized vowel (etc.) corresponding to the Norse runic letter Áss and the Proto-Norse runic letter AnsuR.)
 Old Norwegian and Old Icelandic (æ̨, ø̨, a᷎, e᷎, i᷎, o᷎, ø᷎, u᷎)
 Onondaga dialects (ę, ǫ), (Alternatively, eñ and oñ can also be used. ų is sometimes used for ǫ)
 Otomi dialects (ą, į, ɛ̨)
 Polish (letters ą, ę)
 Rheinische Dokumenta (ą̈, ǫ, ǫ̈, ą̈ą̈, ǫǫ, ǫ̈ǫ̈)
 Shapsugh (s̨, s̨u, z̨, z̨u, c̨u, c̨ɦu)
 Tawlu (n̨)
 Ubykh (s̨, s̨u, z̨, z̨u, c̨, c̨u, c̨, c̨'u, j̨, j̨u)

Example in Polish:

 
  
 — The ox asks him: "Mr. beetle, why do you buzz like that in the thicket?"
 — Jan Brzechwa, Chrząszcz

Example in Cayuga:

  — we will become poor

Example in Chickasaw:

  - I am walking

Example in Dogrib:

  — native people

Example in Lithuanian:

 
 
 — Vincas Mykolaitis-Putinas, Margi sakalai

Example in Elfdalian:

"Ja, eð war įe plåg að gęslkallum, dar eð war slaik uondlostjyner i gęslun."
 — Vikar Margit Andersdotter, I fäbodlivet i gamla tider.

Example in Western Apache:

  — created

Values

Nasalization
The use of the ogonek to indicate nasality is common in the transcription of the indigenous languages of the Americas. This usage originated in the orthographies created by Christian missionaries to transcribe these languages. Later, the practice was continued by Americanist anthropologists and linguists who still, to the present day, follow this convention in phonetic transcription (see Americanist phonetic notation).

The ogonek is also used  to indicate a nasalized vowel in Polish, academic transliteration of Proto-Germanic, Old Church Slavonic, Navajo, Western Apache, Chiricahua, Tłįchǫ Yatiì, Slavey, Dëne Sųłiné and Elfdalian. In Polish, ę is nasalized e; however, ą is nasalized o, not a, because of a vowel shift: ą, originally a long nasal a, turned into a short nasal o when the distinction in vowel quantity disappeared.

Length
In Lithuanian, the nosinė (literally, "nasal") mark originally indicated vowel nasalization but around late 17th and early 18th century, nasal vowels gradually evolved into the corresponding long non-nasal vowels in most dialects. Thus, the mark is now de facto an indicator of vowel length (the length of etymologically non-nasal vowels is marked differently or not marked at all). The mark also helps to distinguish different grammatical forms with otherwise the same written form (often with a different word stress, which is not indicated directly in the standard orthography).

Lowered articulation
Between 1927 and 1989, the ogonek denoted lowering in vowels, and, since 1976, in consonants as well, in the International Phonetic Alphabet (IPA). While the obsolete diacritic has also been identified as the left half ring diacritic , many publications of the IPA used the ogonek.

In Rheinische Dokumenta, it marks vowels that are more open than those denoted by their base letters Ää, Oo, Öö. In two cases, it can be combined with umlaut marks.

Similar diacritics

E caudata and o caudata
The E caudata (ę), a symbol similar to an e with ogonek, evolved from a ligature of a and e in medieval scripts, in Latin and Irish palaeography. The O caudata of Old Norse (letter ǫ, with ǫ́) is used to write the open-mid back rounded vowel, . Medieval Nordic manuscripts show this 'hook' in both directions, in combination with several vowels. Despite this distinction, the term 'ogonek' is sometimes used in discussions of typesetting and encoding Norse texts, as o caudata is typographically identical to o with ogonek.

Cedilla and comma
The ogonek is functionally equivalent to the cedilla and comma diacritic marks. If two of these three are used within the same orthography their respective use is restricted to certain classes of letters, i.e. usually the ogonek is used with vowels whereas the cedilla is applied to consonants. In handwritten text, the marks may even look the same.

Superscript ogonek
In Old Norse and Old Icelandic manuscripts, there is an over-hook or curl that may be considered a variant of the ogonek. It occurs on the letters a᷎ e᷎ i᷎ o᷎ ø᷎ u᷎.

Letters with ogonek

Typographical notes
The ogonek should be almost the same size as a descender (relatively, its size in larger type may be significantly shorter), and should not be confused with the cedilla or comma diacritics used in other languages.

Encoding 
Because attaching an ogonek does not affect the shape of the base letter, Unicode covers it with a combining diacritic, U+0328.

LaTeX2e 
In LaTeX2e, macro \k will typeset a letter with ogonek, if it is supported by the font encoding, e.g. \k{a} will typeset ą. (The default LaTeX OT1 encoding does not support it, but the newer T1 one does. It may be enabled by saying \usepackage[T1]{fontenc} in the preamble.)

However, \k{e} rather places the diacritic "right-aligned" with the carrying e (ę), suitably for Polish, while \textogonekcentered horizontally centers the diacritic with respect to the carrier, suitably for Native American Languages as well as for e caudata and o caudata. So \textogonekcentered{e} better fits the latter purposes. Actually, \k{o} (for ǫ) is defined to result in \textogonekcentered{o}, and \k{O} is defined to result in \textogonekcentered{O}.

The package TIPA, activated by using the command "\usepackage{tipa}", offers a different way: "\textpolhook{a}" will produce ą.

References

External links 

 Diacritics Project — All you need to design a font with correct accents
 Polish Diacritics — How To?
 Förslag till en enhetlig stavning för älvdalska (March, 2005)
 w3schools.com — UTF-8 Latin Extended A

Latin-script diacritics
Lithuanian language
Diakrytyka